Daviesia podophylla, commonly known as buggery bush, is a species of flowering plant in the family Fabaceae and is endemic to the south-west of Western Australia. It is an openly-branched, glabrous, glaucous shrub with many often sharply-pointed branchlets, triangular phyllodes with a sharp point on the end, and orange-yellow, dark red and black flowers.

Description

Taxonomy and naming
Daviesia podophylla was first formally described in 1984 by Michael Crisp in the journal Nuytsia from specimens collected west of Coorow in 1978. The specific epithet (podophylla) means "foot-leaved", referring to the petiole-like base of the phyllodes.

Distribution and habitat
This daviesia grows in heath between Perth and Kalbarri, and is common from Jurien Bay to Three Springs, in the Avon Wheatbelt, Geraldton Sandplains, Jarrah Forest and Swan Coastal Plain biogeographic regions of south-western Western Australia.

Conservation status
Daviesia podophylla is listed as "not threatened" by the Western Australian Government Department of Biodiversity, Conservation and Attractions.

References

podophylla
Eudicots of Western Australia
Plants described in 1984
Taxa named by Michael Crisp